Raorchestes chotta, also known as the small bushfrog or small bush frog, is a species of frog found only in Ponmudi in the Western Ghats of Kerala, India. This frog   lays eggs attached to the underside of a leaf. They hatch as tiny froglets, skipping the tadpole stage. The adult frogs are light brown in color.

References

External links

chotta
Frogs of India
Endemic fauna of the Western Ghats
Amphibians described in 2009